The 1994–95 Detroit Red Wings season was the Red Wings' 63rd season, the franchise's 69th. The Red Wings started the 1994–95 season strong, and finished it strong, going 33–11–4 for 70 points in 48 games. Having the league's best regular-season record, they were awarded the Presidents' Trophy. They tied the Chicago Blackhawks for most power play goals with 52 and had the second-best power-play in the league (24.64%). Veteran forward Ray Sheppard scored 30 goals on just 125 shots.

Offseason

Regular season

Season standings

Schedule and results

Playoffs
The Red Wings dominated the first three rounds of the 1995 NHL playoffs, going 12–2 and outscoring their opponents 54–28 during that span. On Sunday June 11, the Red Wings advanced to the Stanley Cup Finals, their first Finals appearance since 1966 with a 2–1 double-overtime victory against the Chicago Blackhawks in game five of the 1995 Western Conference Finals. Forward Vyacheslav Kozlov scored the game-winner at 2:25 of the second overtime period.

The Red Wings were stunned in the 1995 Stanley Cup Finals in four-game sweep at the hands of the underdog New Jersey Devils, whose neutral-zone trap system held Detroit to just seven goals in the series.

Stanley Cup Finals

Player statistics

Regular season
Scoring

Goaltending

Playoffs
Scoring

Goaltending

Note: GP = Games played; G = Goals; A = Assists; Pts = Points; +/- = Plus-minus PIM = Penalty minutes; PPG = Power-play goals; SHG = Short-handed goals; GWG = Game-winning goals;
      MIN = Minutes played; W = Wins; L = Losses; T = Ties; GA = Goals against; GAA = Goals-against average;  SO = Shutouts; SA=Shots against; SV=Shots saved; SV% = Save percentage;

Transactions

Trades

Draft picks

References
Red Wings on Hockey Database

Detroit Red Wings seasons
Presidents' Trophy seasons
D
D
Western Conference (NHL) championship seasons
Det
Detroit Red Wings
Detroit Red Wings